Victory Square (Ploshchad Pobedy) is the central square in Kaliningrad.

Prior to 1945, the square was part of Königsberg, Germany. Steindamm Gate, part of the city's northwestern Baroque city walls, was dismantled in 1912 to allow development of the area between Steindamm and the Hufen suburbs. The road leading from central Königsberg to Mittelhufen was known first as Kaiser-Wilhelm-Damm in honor of Wilhelm II, German Emperor. After the abdication of the House of Hohenzollern in 1918, the road was renamed to Hansaring and the prominent square nearby to Hansaplatz, honoring the city's participation in the Hanseatic League from 1339-1579. The square was then renamed Adolf-Hitler-Platz in 1934 to honor the Nazi leader. East of the square were the grounds of the Ostmesse trade fair. Königsberg was transferred to the Soviet Union in 1945 and then renamed Kaliningrad.

While most of central Königsberg was destroyed during World War II, the northern suburban area around the square survived intact. Post-war Kaliningrad developed around the square, which was renamed Victory Square to honor the Russian victory. Many banks, shops, malls, and the city government are in the vicinity of the square. The Kaliningrad Severny railway station, formerly the Königsberg Nordbahnhof built in 1930, is a business centre. The Handelshof or Stadthaus, built by Hanns Hopp in 1923, still functions as the seat of the city administration as Kaliningrad City Hall. Kaliningrad State Technical University is located in the former provincial court, while the FSB have offices in the former police headquarters.

During the celebration of the 750th anniversary of the founding of the city in 2005 the square was thoroughly renovated. A new fountain was placed in the centre and the new Cathedral of Christ the Saviour was consecrated in the same year. The statue of Lenin, previously in front of the cathedral, was removed from the square and placed at another site in Kaliningrad in 2006.

Sources 
Rainer Eisenschmid: Baltikum. Baedeker 2001, page 454 (Online preview with Google Books)

Information about Kaliningrad
Photos and information about Kaliningrad
Article about the square on Russland-Aktuell

Buildings and structures in Kaliningrad
Squares in Russia
Tourist attractions in Kaliningrad Oblast